Choriolaus is a genus of beetles in the family Cerambycidae, containing the following species:

 Choriolaus aegrotus Bates, 1885
 Choriolaus auratus Giesbert & Wappes, 1999
 Choriolaus celestae (Chemsak & Linsley, 1974)
 Choriolaus derhami Chemsak & Linsley, 1976
 Choriolaus filicornis (Linsley & Chemsak, 1971)
 Choriolaus flavirostris (Bates, 1880)
 Choriolaus fulveolus (Bates, 1885)
 Choriolaus gracilis (Chemsak & Linsley, 1974)
 Choriolaus hirsutus (Bates, 1885)
 Choriolaus howdeni Giesbert & Wappes, 1999
 Choriolaus latescens Bates, 1885
 Choriolaus nigripennis Giesbert & Wappes, 1999
 Choriolaus ruficollis (Pascoe, 1866)
 Choriolaus sabinoensis (Knull, 1954)
 Choriolaus sulcipennis Linsley, 1970
 Choriolaus suturalis Giesbert & Wappes, 1999

References